The Elvis Presley Birthplace is a historic museum site in Tupelo, Mississippi dedicated to the preservation of the birthplace of American musician Elvis Presley. It is listed on the Mississippi Blues Trail.

The museum site includes the birthplace home of Elvis Presley, a museum, a chapel, and the Assembly of God Church building where the Presley family worshipped. Financially, times were hard on Vernon and Gladys, and they had to move out of the shotgun house when Elvis was only a few years old for lack of payment. Vernon and Gladys worked various jobs while in Tupelo and moved several different times during the thirteen years they resided in Mississippi.

An F5 tornado struck  outside the city on April 5, 1936. The catastrophic tornado killed hundreds but spared the Presley's house and the family was unharmed.

See also
List of music museums
List of Mississippi Landmarks (Under Lee County)
Mississippi Blues Trail

References

External links

 

Elvis Presley
Presley
Presley, Elvis
Historic house museums in Mississippi
Mississippi Blues Trail
Museums in Lee County, Mississippi
Shotgun architecture